Melanospora is a genus of fungi within the Ceratostomataceae family.

Species

Melanospora aculeata
Melanospora affine
Melanospora angulosa
Melanospora anomala
Melanospora antarctica
Melanospora arachnophila
Melanospora arenaria
Melanospora argadis
Melanospora asclepiadis
Melanospora asparagi
Melanospora asperrima
Melanospora aurea
Melanospora betae
Melanospora brevirostrata
Melanospora brevirostris
Melanospora bromelifoliae
Melanospora camelina
Melanospora caprina
Melanospora cervicula
Melanospora chionea
Melanospora chrysomella
Melanospora coemansii
Melanospora collipora
Melanospora coprophila
Melanospora curvicola
Melanospora damnosa
Melanospora endobiotica
Melanospora epimyces
Melanospora erythraea
Melanospora exsola
Melanospora fallax
Melanospora fayodi
Melanospora fimbriata
Melanospora fusispora
Melanospora gibelliana
Melanospora globosa
Melanospora helleri
Melanospora hypomyces
Melanospora interna
Melanospora karstenii
Melanospora kurssanoviana
Melanospora lagenaria
Melanospora leucotricha
Melanospora linkii
Melanospora longisetosa
Melanospora lucifuga
Melanospora lunulata
Melanospora macrospora
Melanospora manginii
Melanospora marchaliana
Melanospora marchicum
Melanospora mattiroloana
Melanospora nectrioides
Melanospora octahedrica
Melanospora otagensis
Melanospora pampeana
Melanospora papillata
Melanospora pascuensis
Melanospora pegleri
Melanospora phaseoli
Melanospora pinitorqua
Melanospora poae
Melanospora radicis-pini
Melanospora rhizophila
Melanospora rubi
Melanospora schmidtii
Melanospora setchellii
Melanospora similis
Melanospora singaporensis
Melanospora solani
Melanospora stysanophora
Melanospora terrestris
Melanospora tiffanyae
Melanospora townei
Melanospora tulasnei
Melanospora verrucispora
Melanospora vitrea
Melanospora washingtonensis
Melanospora wentii
Melanospora zamiae
Melanospora zobelii

References

External links 
 Melanospora at Index Fungorum

Sordariomycetes genera
Melanosporales